The Hairy Bikers' Cookbook (renamed The Hairy Bikers Ride Again for the third series and The Hairy Bakers for the fourth series) is a BBC television cookery and travel programme, that has so far run for four series and a Christmas special. It is presented by The Hairy Bikers; Dave Myers and Si King, both of whom are from northern England, as they travel around the world on their motorbikes tasting the local cuisine, and experimenting with making it themselves. They also talk about the culture and the history of the area that they are visiting, with a sense of humour and passion that has been praised by critics and fans.

Episodes
Episodes (except the winter special) bear the on-screen title Si and Dave do [location], with part 1 or part 2 appended where necessary.

Pilot

Series 1 (The Hairy Bikers' Cookbook)

Series 2 (The Hairy Bikers' Cookbook)

Series 3 (The Hairy Bikers Ride Again)

Special (The Hairy Bikers Come Home)

Series 4 (The Hairy Bakers)

A fourth series, based in the UK and concentrating on bread, cakes and pastry products began airing on BBC Two on 18 August 2008.

Special

Books
A hardback book was released to accompany the first two series. A second one has been released to coincide with the third series' release.

DVD release
The first two series have been released onto a Region 2 DVD, although the Portugal episodes are not included.

External links
 
The Hairy Bikers' official website
 
 

2005 British television series debuts
2008 British television series endings
2000s British cooking television series
BBC Television shows
British cooking television shows
English-language television shows
Motorcycle television series